The 2017 Prestige Hotels & Resorts Curling Classic was held from September 29 to October 2 at the Vernon Curling Club in Vernon, British Columbia as part of the 2017-18 World Curling Tour. The men's event was a triple knockout format, while the women's event was held in a round robin format.

Men

Teams

Knockout results
The draw is listed as follows:

A event

B event

C event

Playoffs

Women

Teams

Round-robin standings

Playoffs

References

External links

2017 in Canadian curling
Sport in Vernon, British Columbia
Curling in British Columbia
2017 in British Columbia
September 2017 sports events in Canada
October 2017 sports events in Canada